Wellington de Oliveira Monteiro or simply Wellington Monteiro (born September 7, 1978 in Rio de Janeiro) is a defensive midfielder player from Brazil.

Career
In January 2010 Goias Esporte Clube officially signed the expert midfielder, who recently re-signed with Fluminense, the player signed a one-year contract.

Honours
Copa Libertadores: 2006
FIFA Club World Championship: 2006
South America Supercup: 2007

External links
 Guardian Stats Centre
 internacional.com.br
 zerozero.pt
 globoesporte

References

1978 births
Living people
Brazilian footballers
Bangu Atlético Clube players
Cruzeiro Esporte Clube players
CR Vasco da Gama players
Sociedade Esportiva e Recreativa Caxias do Sul players
Esporte Clube Juventude players
Sport Club Internacional players
Fluminense FC players
Guarani FC players
Association football midfielders
Footballers from Rio de Janeiro (city)